Artyom Yuryevich Antipov (born 28 November 1988) is a Russian former professional football player.

Club career
He played in the Russian Football National League for FC Sodovik Sterlitamak in 2007.

External links
 
 

1988 births
People from Sterlitamak
Living people
Russian footballers
Association football midfielders
FC Sodovik Sterlitamak players
FC Dynamo Vologda players
FC Sakhalin Yuzhno-Sakhalinsk players
Sportspeople from Bashkortostan